The Desert Flower is a 1925 American silent Western film directed by Irving Cummings and written by June Mathis. It is based on the 1924 play The Desert Flower by Don Mullally. The film stars Colleen Moore, Lloyd Hughes, Kate Price, Gino Corrado, Fred Warren, and Frank Brownlee. The film was released on June 21, 1925, by First National Pictures.

Plot
As described in a film magazine review, Maggie Fortune, left motherless in her box car home in the West, meets the dissipated Rance Conway, son of a wealthy New Yorker who has turned him out. She is taught to read as she attempts to reform him. Her stepfather
Mike Dyer admires her, but after a struggle with him she runs away with her little sister to Bull Frog, a new mining town. With the first money she earns in the dance hall there, she sends the baby to a nursing home in San Francisco, and proceeds to make a man out of Rance, whom she now deeply loves. She taunts Rance in a new attempt to make a man out of him, and grub stakes him. He returns, having conquered his desire for drink. He has found a gold mine for which $10,000 has been offered, just as Dyer has located Maggie. Dyer has almost overpowered Maggie when a gunshot is fired and he apparently drops dead. Maggie, Rance, and José Lee each claim that they fired the shot. Dyer however is only wounded. Rance takes Maggie on a honeymoon to his home in New York.

Cast

Production
This was the third of five films, in three years, with Moore and Hughes starring in the lead roles. They also appeared together in The Huntress (1923), Sally (1925), Irene (1926), and Ella Cinders (1926).

References

External links

 
 
 Still and ads at www.silentfilmstillarchive.com
 Stills at silenthollywood.com

1925 films
1925 Western (genre) films
First National Pictures films
Films directed by Irving Cummings
American black-and-white films
Silent American Western (genre) films
1920s American films